This article shows the rosters of all participating teams at the women's rugby sevens tournament at the 2016 Summer Olympics in Rio de Janeiro.

Pool A

Australia
The following is the Australia roster in the women's rugby sevens tournament of the 2016 Summer Olympics.

Head coach: Tim Walsh

Colombia
The following is the Colombia roster in the women's rugby sevens tournament of the 2016 Summer Olympics.

Head coach: Laurent Palau

Fiji
The following is the Fiji roster in the women's rugby sevens tournament of the 2016 Summer Olympics.

Head coach: Chris Cracknell

 Jiowana Sauto was included in the day 3 squad after Daveau was injured in day 2.

United States
The following is the United States roster in the women's rugby sevens tournament of the 2016 Summer Olympics.

Head coach: Richie Walker

Pool B

France
The following is the France roster in the women's rugby sevens tournament of the 2016 Summer Olympics.

Head coach: David Courteix

 Jessy Tremouliere was a late addition before the Olympics, replacing Christelle Le Duff who replaced Shannon Izar.

Kenya
The following is the Kenya roster in the women's rugby sevens tournament of the 2016 Summer Olympics.

Head coach: Michael Mulima

New Zealand
The following is the New Zealand roster in the women's rugby sevens tournament of the 2016 Summer Olympics.

Head coach: Sean Horan

Spain
The following is the Spain roster in the women's rugby sevens tournament of the 2016 Summer Olympics.

Head coach: José Antonio Barrio

Pool C

Brazil
The following is the Brazil roster in the women's rugby sevens tournament of the 2016 Summer Olympics.

Head coach: Chris Neill

Trainer: Aristide Guerriero

 Reserve Mariana Barbosa Ramalho was added to the main squad after day 1 after Sardá suffered an injury.

Canada
The following was the Canada roster in the women's rugby sevens tournament of the 2016 Summer Olympics.

Head coach: John Tait

 Brittany Benn
 Hannah Darling
 Bianca Farella
 Jen Kish (C)
 Ghislaine Landry
 Megan Lukan
 Kayla Moleschi
 Karen Paquin
 Kelly Russell
 Ashley Steacy
 Natasha Watcham-Roy
 Charity Williams

Great Britain
The following is the Great Britain squad in the women's rugby sevens tournament of the 2016 Summer Olympics.

Head coach: Simon Middleton

Japan
The following is the Japan roster in the women's rugby sevens tournament of the 2016 Summer Olympics.

Head coach: Keiko Asami

 Reserve Aya Takeuchi was added to the main squad after day 1 after Tomita suffered an injury.

See also
Rugby sevens at the 2016 Summer Olympics – Men's team squads

References

External links
 – Rio 2016 Olympic Coverage

2016

Olympics
Squads